Alfred Eduard Emmerich Rosé (11 December 1902, Vienna –7 May 1975, London, Ontario, Canada) was an Austrian composer and conductor.

He was the elder brother of Alma Rosé, son of Arnold Rosé, and the nephew of Gustav Mahler.  He studied in Vienna under Richard Robert.

Rosé's music and ability to perform had been revoked by the Reichsmusikkammer, so he and his wife departed Vienna, Austria for the United States on September 28, 1938. While in America, Alfred Rosé began teaching and his pieces were being performed again.

See also
Arnold Rosé
Eduard Rosé

References

1902 births
1975 deaths
Canadian male composers
Austrian male composers
Austrian composers
Austrian conductors (music)
Male conductors (music)
Jewish Canadian musicians
Austrian Jews
Romanian Jews
Austrian people of Romanian-Jewish descent
Canadian people of Austrian-Jewish descent
Canadian people of Romanian-Jewish descent
Musicians from Vienna
Austrian emigrants to Canada
20th-century Canadian composers
20th-century Canadian conductors (music)
20th-century Canadian male musicians